Pakistan competed at the 1996 Summer Olympics in Atlanta, United States.

Results by event

Athletics

Women's long jump

 Shabana Akhtar
 Qualifying round Group B; 5.80m (→ did not advance, finished 16th out of 17 in group)

Shabana Akhtar became the first Pakistani woman to participate in the Olympic Games

Men's hammer throw

 Aqarab Abbas
 Qualifying round Group B; 65.60m (→ did not advance, finished 16th out of 18 in group)

Boxing
Men's Light Flyweight (– 48 kg)
 Abdul Rashid Qambrani
 1/16 elimination; Lost to Oleg Kiryukhin (UKR) on pts 17:3

Men's Light Welterweight (– 63.5 kg)
 Usmanullah Khan
 1/16 elimination; Lost to Nordine Mouchi (FRA) KO in rd 1

Men's Welterweight (– 67 kg)
 Abdul Rasheed Baloch
 1/16 elimination; Beat Jesús Flores (MEX) on pts 12:7
 1/8 elimination; Lost to Nurzhan Smanov (KAZ) on pts 13:9

Men's Super Heavyweight (+ 91 kg)
 Safarish Khan
 1/16 elimination; Bye
 1/8 elimination; Lost to Duncan Dokiwari (NGR) RSC in rd 2

Hockey

Men's Team Competition

Preliminaries Group A

 Defeated  (4-0)
 Defeated  (6-2)

Classification matches

 5th-8th places; Defeated  (2-1)

Pakistan finished 6th

Team Roster

Mansoor Ahmed (gk) (captain)
Tahir Zaman (vice-captain)
Khalid Mahmood (gk)
Naveed Alam
Rana Mujahid
Danish Kaleem
Mohammad Usman
Mohammad Khalid Sr
Shafqat Malik
Irfan Mahmood
Muhammad Sarwar
Rahim Khan
Aleem Raza
Shahbaz Ahmed
Mohammad Shahbaz
Kamran Ashraf

Swimming

Men's 100 metres butterfly

 Kamal Salman Masud
 Heat 1; 58.59 (→ did not advance)

Wrestling Freestyle

Men's 90 kg

 Mohammad Bashir Bhola Bhala
 Round 1; Lost to Makharbek Khadartsev (RUS) on pts 10:0

References
Official Olympic Reports

Nations at the 1996 Summer Olympics
1996 Summer Olympics
Summer Olympics